The Kiddie (stylized as THE KIDDIE) was a five-member visual kei rock band from Tokyo, Japan. The band was formed in May 2007 by vocalist Yusa (ex-Kazoku) and drummer Yuudai (ex-Kazoku).

History
They held their first live performance on July 1, 2007 at Meguro Rockmaykan, and then debuted their first single "Little Senobi" on October 3, 2007. In 2010, The Kiddie signed with major label King Records and released their major debut single "Smile". on July 14. The Kiddie released their first album, Brave New World, on November 24, 2010. Their second album, MA★PIECE was released on March 28, 2012. Their third album, The 5 -FIVE- was released on November 28, 2012.

Members
 Yusa (揺紗) - vocals
 Yuusei (佑聖) - lead guitar
 Jun (淳) -  rhythm guitar
 Sorao (そらお) - bass
 Yuudai (ユウダイ) - drums

Discography

Studio albums
 Single Collection (March 24, 2010)
 Brave New World (November 24, 2010)
 Ma★Piece (March 28, 2012)
 The 5 -Five- (November 28, 2012)
 Single Collection 2 (May 1, 2013)
 Dystopia (November 26, 2014)

Singles
 Little Senobi (October 3, 2007)
 Little Senobi (2nd press, January 23, 2008) - Oricon Single Chart Ranking No.184
 Plastic Art (March 26, 2008) - Oricon Single Chart Ranking No.133
 Sayonara Setsuna (サヨナラセツナ, A Goodbye Moment,October 1, 2008) - Oricon Single Chart Ranking No.103
 Noah (April 15, 2009) - Oricon Single Chart Ranking No.55
 Elite Star＋ (July 8, 2009) - Oricon Single Chart Ranking No.58
 Soar (October 7, 2009) - Oricon Single Chart Ranking No.35
 Black Side (November 4, 2009) - Oricon Single Chart Ranking No.42
 Poplar (ポプラ, December 2, 2009) - Oricon Single Chart Ranking No.48
 Smile. (July 14, 2010) - Oricon Single Chart Ranking No.19
 Calling (September 22, 2010) - Oricon Single Chart Ranking No.34
 Nutty Nasty (May 25, 2011) - Oricon Single Chart Ranking No.50
 Sun'z Up (August 13, 2011)
 Utsukushiki Redrum (美しきREDRUM, Beautiful Redrum, September 28, 2011) - Oricon Single Chart Ranking No.21 
 I Sing For You (August 1, 2012) - Oricon Single Chart Ranking No.27 
 emit. (February 2, 2014)
 1414287356 (April 16, 2014)
 OMELAS (November 26, 2014)

DVDs
 The Kiddie Happy Spring Tour 2011: Kidd's Now (September 7, 2011)
 Wonder World (ワンダーワールド, August 4, 2013)

Others
 V-Rock Disney - V.A compilation album (Mary Poppins - "Supercalifragilisticexpialidocious", September 14, 2011)
 Tribute II -Visual Spirits- - V.A compilation album (hide - "Damage", July 3, 2013)

References

External links
  
 Official blog
 Visunavi profile

Visual kei musical groups
Japanese rock music groups
Japanese pop rock music groups
Musical groups established in 2007
Musical groups disestablished in 2015
Musical quintets
Musical groups from Tokyo